The Office of Astronomy for Development (OAD) is an office of the International Astronomical Union (IAU) established in 2011 to further the use of astronomy as a tool for development. The OAD is jointly funded by the International Astronomical Union and the National Research Foundation of South Africa. The office consists of nine regional offices located in Armenia, China, Colombia, Ethiopia, Jordan, Nigeria, Portugal, Thailand and Zambia which have similar objectives to the OAD but with regional focus. The OAD annually issues a call for proposals to fund projects which use Astronomy as a tool to address an issue related to sustainable development. The mission of the OAD is to help further the use of astronomy as a tool for development by mobilizing the human and financial resources necessary in order to realize the field's scientific, technological and cultural benefits to society. As of 2017 the OAD had administered a total of €515,364 in IAU grant funds. These funds have been awarded to 106 projects that reached over 85 countries across the world.

History 
The OAD was established on the 16th of April 2011 at the South African Astronomical Observatory (SAAO) in Cape Town. It was launched by the South African Minister of Science and Technology Naledi Pandor. In 2016 the IAU together with the OAD director Kevin Govender was awarded the Edinburgh Medal for "furthering education and technological capacity worldwide through the inspirational science of astronomy".

See also 
 List of astronomical societies

References 

Scientific organisations based in South Africa
Astronomy organizations
Scientific organizations established in 2011
Organizations established in 2011
2011 establishments in South Africa